Now Is Not Forever is the first full-length album from Christian hip-hop artist B. Reith. It was released on September 22, 2009, through Gotee Records.

Track listing
All songs written by Brian Reith except where noted.

 "Intro (Excuse Me Everybody)" - 1:02
 "The Comeback Kid" - 3:43
 "I Know" - 3:22
 "Mess" - 3:50
 "Antidote" - 4:07
 "My Story" - 3:20
 "U Should Know" - 3:46
 "Wish That" - 4:13
 "Old School" (Brian Reith, Dave HuYoung) - 3:07
 "Rain Down" - 5:03
 "Just For You" - 4:02
 "Breathe" - 4:18

Awards
The album was nominated for a Dove Award for Rap/Hip-Hop Album of the Year at the 41st GMA Dove Awards. In 2009, a music video for the song "The Comeback Kid" was released.

Chart performance

The album peaked at #2 on the Top R&B/Hip-Hop Albums list.  
The song "Antidote" peaked at #50 on Billboard's list of Christian Songs.

References

External links
 B. Reith's official website

2009 albums
Christian hip hop albums